Moischt [] is a borough (Ortsbezirk) of Marburg in Hesse.

References

External links 
 Information about Moischt at www.moischt.net
 https://www.marburg.de/moischt
 

Districts of Marburg
Marburg-Biedenkopf